Horace R. Brown (born 1860) was an English footballer who played for Stoke.

Career
Brown was born in Stoke-upon-Trent and played for Stoke in their first competitive match in the FA Cup against Manchester in a 2–1 defeat. He stayed at Stoke until the end of the 1886–87 season where he played in three more FA Cup matches He later went on to play for Stoke St Peter's.

Career statistics

References

English footballers
Stoke City F.C. players
1860 births
Year of death missing
Association football midfielders